Cole Kenna Hikutini (born June 11, 1994) is an American football tight end for the Michigan Panthers of the United States Football League (USFL). He played college football at the University of Louisville.

Early years
Hikutini attended Pleasant Grove High School in Elk Grove, California, where he was a two-way player. As a senior, he collected 27 receptions for 536 yards and six touchdowns, receiving second-team All-Delta River League honors as a defensive back. He had 143 receiving yards and one touchdown against Lincoln High School.

College career
Hikutini accepted a football scholarship from Sacramento State. He was redshirted in 2012. As a freshman in 2013, he appeared in nine games, starting the last four, while registering 21 receptions and five touchdowns. He had five receptions for 42 yards and two touchdowns against the University of Montana.

He transferred to San Francisco City College in 2014. He posted 40 receptions for 658 yards and four touchdowns. He transferred to the University of Louisville after his sophomore season.

As a junior, he appeared in 11 games (three starts), making 19 receptions (fourth on the team) for 348 yards (fourth on the team) and three touchdowns (tied for second on the team). As a senior, playing alongside Heisman Trophy winner quarterback Lamar Jackson, he recorded 50 receptions (led the team) for 668 yards (second on the team) and eight touchdowns (led the team). He suffered a knee injury during the 9-29 Citrus Bowl loss against LSU.

College statistics

Professional career

San Francisco 49ers
Hikutini was signed by the San Francisco 49ers as an undrafted free agent on May 4, 2017. He was waived on September 2, and was signed to the practice squad the next day. He was promoted to the active roster on October 14. In Week 7, in the 40–10 loss to the Dallas Cowboys, he had his first career NFL reception, a five-yard catch. He was placed on the injured reserve list on November 6.

On September 1, 2018, Hikutini was waived by the 49ers.

Minnesota Vikings
On September 3, 2018, Hikutini was signed to the Minnesota Vikings' practice squad. He signed a reserve/future contract with the Vikings on January 2, 2019. He was waived on August 31, 2019.

Dallas Cowboys
On September 2, 2019, Hikutini was signed to the Dallas Cowboys practice squad. On December 30, 2019, Hikutini was signed to a reserve/future contract.

On September 4, 2020, Hikutini was waived by the Cowboys and re-signed to the practice squad. He signed a reserve/future contract with the Cowboys on January 4, 2021. He was waived by the Dallas Cowboys on March 19, 2021.

New York Giants 
On March 30, 2021, Hikutini was signed by the New York Giants, reuniting with offensive coordinator Jason Garrett, who was his head coach with the Cowboys in 2019. He was waived/injured on August 24, 2021 and placed on injured reserve. He was released on September 2.

Michigan Panthers
On October 6, 2022, Hikutini signed with the Michigan Panthers of the United States Football League (USFL).

Personal life
Hikutini has lived in San Francisco, Sacramento, Elk Grove, and Wilton.

References

External links
New York Giants bio
Dallas Cowboys bio
Louisville Cardinals bio

1994 births
Living people
American people of French Polynesian descent
Sportspeople from Elk Grove, California
Players of American football from San Francisco
American football tight ends
Sacramento State Hornets football players
City College of San Francisco Rams football players
Louisville Cardinals football players
San Francisco 49ers players
Minnesota Vikings players
Dallas Cowboys players
New York Giants players
Michigan Panthers (2022) players